Ettington is a hamlet in Sutton Rural Municipality No. 103, Saskatchewan, Canada. It previously held the status of a village until December 31, 1948.

Demographics

Prior to December 31, 1948, Ettington was incorporated as a village, and was restructured as a hamlet under the jurisdiction of the Rural municipality of Sutton No. 103 on that date.

See also

List of communities in Saskatchewan
Hamlets of Saskatchewan

References

Sutton No. 103, Saskatchewan
Former villages in Saskatchewan
Unincorporated communities in Saskatchewan
Division No. 3, Saskatchewan